The Brantly B-2 is an American two-seat light helicopter produced by the Brantly Helicopter Corporation.

Design and development
After the failure of his first design, the Brantly B-1, Newby O. Brantly decided to design a simpler and less complicated helicopter for the private buyer. The B-2 had a single main rotor and an anti-torque tail rotor and first flew on 21 February 1953. This was followed by an improved second prototype that first flew on 14 August 1956.

The B-2A was introduced with a modified cabin, and the B-2B had a larger 180 hp fuel-injected engine. The B-2B has a three-bladed articulated main rotor and an all-metal fuselage, it can be operated with skid, wheel or float landing gear. The piston engine is fitted vertically in the fuselage behind the cabin.

Operational history
The basic design has remained in production for over 50 years. The United States Army ordered five B-2s (designated the YHO-3) to be evaluated  in the Light Observation Helicopter competition in 1958, although it lost the bid, the Army operated the H-5T unmanned variant as target from 1986. Introduced in the early 1970s, an improved larger version with five seats was designated the Brantly 305.

Variants

 Brantly B-2: Two-seat single-engined light utility helicopter.
 Brantly YHO-3: United States military designation for the B2.
 Brantly B-2A: Initial production version.
 Brantly B-2B: Improved version, fitted with new metal rotor blades, and an uprated fuel-injected 180 hp Lycoming piston engine.
 Brantly 305: Larger five-seat version.
 H-2: Designation of the B-2B built by Brantly-Hynes between 1976 and 1979.
 Brantly B-2J10: Projected tandem-rotor version with longer and wider fuselage for carrying passengers and/or cargo. Unbuilt.
 V750 UAV: An UAV version developed by Qingdao Haili Helicopters Co. Ltd., a joint venture between Brantly International Inc, Qingdao Wenquan International Aviation Investment Co., Ltd, and Qingdao Brantly Investment Consultation Co., Ltd.  Maiden flight was completed on May 7, 2011, and received an order from an unnamed customer

Accidents and incidents
The B-2 has had 21 fatal accidents between February 1964 and August 2009.

Survivors
 B-2 N2143U was purchased in 1962 and flown by Dean Svec for all of its total of 2,108 hrs. It was retired in 2006 and is now on permanent public display at the Crawford Auto-Aviation Museum, Western Reserve Historical Society in Cleveland, Ohio.

A B2B belonging to the Flying Gyrocopter and Old Aircraft museum at Midden-Zeeland, Netherlands was reportedly about to fly again November 2009.

A Greek road-assistance company named Express Service based in Thessaloniki operated a B2B Brantly-Hynes helicopter for several years. That helicopter started flying in 1978 and had the Greek registration number SX-AHH. First captain was the pilot Kaltekis Spyridon.

B2 sn#18 is in Chino awaiting restoration after the 2005/2010 floods at Corona airport,a month underwater did little corrosive damage... , a B2B acquired for spares to complete restoration (dual serial numbers found "spliced together bird")

Specifications (B-2B with skid landing gear)

See also

References

Bibliography

 

 Frawley, Gerard. The International Directory of Civil Aircraft. Aerospace Publications Pty Ltd, 1997. .

Further reading
 The Illustrated Encyclopedia of Aircraft (Part Work 1982–1985). London: Orbis Publishing.
 'Aviation Week, 1965
 "British-built Brantlys?" FLIGHT'', 30 January 1959

External links

 Specs & Photo at Flugzeuginfo.net
 Brantly B-2J10 at Stingray's List of Rotorcraft

B-2
1950s United States civil utility aircraft
1950s United States helicopters
Single-engined piston helicopters
Aircraft first flown in 1953